The Pointe de Grave (in occitan : Punta de Grava) is the northernmost tip of the Médoc Peninsula and marks the Northern end of the pine-clad sandy Landes coastline of Western France. It lies in the commune of Le Verdon-sur-Mer and across the Gironde Estuary from the resort town of Royan.

The offshore Cordouan lighthouse lies off the point and a second lighthouse, on the shore, houses a lighthouse museum.

History
It is of strategic significance, owing to its position at the mouth of the Gironde Estuary and was the site of a German fortress during the Second World War, built to guard the entrance to that estuary. In April 1945, US Eighth Air Force B-24s of the 458th Bombardment Group set a new record for precision bombing and destroyed a German battery. The old blockhouse provides panoramic views of the Atlantic Ocean, the Cordouan lighthouse, the Gironde Estuary, Royan, the La Coubre lighthouse, further up the coast from Royan and the Médoc peninsula itself.

During the First World War, United States troops were landed here. A monument marked the place but it was destroyed by the Germans, during their occupation of France in the 1940s.

External links

Landforms of Gironde
Grave